Philippa Haywood (born 6 May 1961) is an English actress. She won the 2005 Rose d'Or Award for Best Female Comedy Performance for Green Wing (2004–2006). Her other television credits include The Brittas Empire (1991–1997), Chimera (1991) Prisoners' Wives (2012–2013) and Scott & Bailey (2012–2016). In 2018, she played the role of Lorraine Craddock in the BBC television series Bodyguard. In 2019 she appeared in series 4 of the BBC Radio 4 Show The Pin.

Early life and education
Haywood was born in Hatfield, Hertfordshire. She attended Hatfield Girls’ Grammar School and trained at the Bristol Old Vic Theatre School.

Career

Television
Haywood has an extensive television career which includes portraying the much put-upon Helen Brittas in the BBC One comedy series The Brittas Empire (1991–1997), Mrs Kitchen in the  CITV animated series Budgie the Little Helicopter (1994-1996), Julie Chadwick in the 2007 BBC Two comedy Fear, Stress & Anger and the hot-tempered, sex-mad human resources director Joanna Clore in Green Wing (2004–2006), for which she won the "best comedy female performance" award at the 2005 Rose d'Or television festival in Lucerne, Switzerland.

Though Haywood is credited as "Philippa Haywood" in her earliest acting appearances, since the second episode of series 2 of The Brittas Empire in 1992 she has always been credited as "Pippa Haywood". She has also appeared in many dramatic roles, including Jenny Thorne in the 1988 ITV drama serial The One Game, and Mrs. Upjohn in the 2008 Agatha Christie's Poirot episode "Cat Among the Pigeons". In 2002 Haywood was a guest star in the last episode of the first series of The Inspector Lynley Mysteries.

In 2007 she played the role of Veronica Gray in the first episode of the second series of Lewis. She appeared in the 2008 ITV period drama series  Lost in Austen as Amanda Price’s mother, Frankie. She also had a guest role in a 2009 episode of Kingdom, and portrayed the disgraced Miss Bunting in several episodes of the first series of Mr Selfridge (2013). Since 2012 she has played one of the lead roles, Harriet, on the BBC One drama Prisoners' Wives, and costarred as Detective Superintendent Julie Dodson on the ITV drama series Scott & Bailey. In 2014 she appeared in the BBC TV adaptation of E.F. Benson's Mapp and Lucia, as Susan Wyse.

In 2015, Haywood took over the role of Helen Golightly in the long-running BBC Radio 4 comedy Clare in the Community. The character was previously played by Liza Tarbuck. In December 2016 she starred in an episode of Midsomer Murders, alongside Hugh Dennis.

In 2017, Haywood appeared in the 2017 version of the British TV sitcom Porridge as Governor Littlewood.

In 2018, Haywood appeared in Bodyguard as Chief Superintendent Lorraine Craddock and in Agatha and the Truth of Murder. In that same year, she played gambling-addicted Reverend Grace in an episode of Agatha Raisin.

In 2020 Haywood appeared in Father Brown in series eight, episode two - "The Queen Bee" - as a revenge filled murderer Eileen Slither. She also appeared in two episodes of Feel Good as the newly divorced mother Felicity.

Haywood also appeared in the Netflix series Bridgerton as the Duke of Hastings' housekeeper, Mrs. Colson. She has performed on several audio dramas, including Doctor Who stories for Big Finish Productions, and the podcast Forest 404 (2019) with Pearl Mackie.

Film and theatre
Haywood has also worked in film and theatre. Recent stage credits include: House & Garden, Private Lives, A Midsummer Night's Dream, The Winter's Tale, Requiem and Landscape with Weapon at the National Theatre. She played the lead role in Wanderlust at the Royal Court Jerwood Theatre Upstairs.

References

External links

English radio actresses
English stage actresses
English film actresses
English television actresses
English Shakespearean actresses
Alumni of Bristol Old Vic Theatre School
Living people
1961 births